Pamela Anne Bowden (17 April 19258 April 2003 (age 78)) was an English  contralto.

Bowden  was born in Rochdale and was educated at Heywood Grammar School and the Royal Manchester College of Music. During World War II she was a Wren. In 1954 she won the Geneva International Music Competition. She  made over  750 professional performances, retiring in 1979.  After this she taught at  the London College of Music and was President of the Incorporated Society of Musicians.

She was also an eloquent advocate of the music of her contemporaries, singing and recording to advantage Tippett's A Child Of Our Time, Britten's ingenuous A Charm Of Lullabies, Lennox Berkeley's tender Four Poems Of St Teresa Of Avila, and the role of Isabella in Bernard Hermann's opera Wuthering Heights. Malcolm Arnold wrote his Five William Blake Songs with Bowden in mind.

Between 1954 and 1979, when she retired, she gave more than 750 performances and/or broadcasts under the most distinguished conductors of the day, among them Josef Krips, Paul Sacher, Solti, Sargent, Boult, Mackerras and Boulez. The consistency of her contributions derived from her innate musicianship and innate sense of the appropriate style.

Bowden's operatic appearances were limited to some with the English Opera Group and the role of Madame Larina in Tchaikovsky's Eugene Onegin, at both Glyndebourne and Covent Garden. Her interpretation of that part, sympathetic and well-pointed as regards the text - she sang it in both Russian and English - showed what the stage lost through the infrequency of her excursions into opera.

In retirement, she had a fruitful career as a singing teacher, an administrator and adjudicator. As I recall from working with her on juries, her judgment was always judicious and assured. While searching for the best in any participant's performance, she was also acute in her ability to put her finger on faults. She was also president of the Incorporated Society of Musicians.

She married the racing driver Derrick Edwards in 1960. He died in 2000: they had two children.

References

1925 births
2003 deaths
English contraltos
People educated at Heywood Grammar School
Alumni of the Royal Manchester College of Music
Academics of the University of West London
Winners of the Geneva International Music Competition
20th-century English women singers
20th-century English singers
Presidents of the Independent Society of Musicians